Robert Quackenbush (November 15, 1923 – October 6, 2006) was a Wisconsin politician.

Born in Sparta, Wisconsin, he served in the United States Military during World War II. Quackenbush graduated from University of Wisconsin–La Crosse and served in the Wisconsin State Assembly from 1971 until 1983. Quachenbush taught school in Tomah, Wisconsin and worked for the Monroe County, Wisconsin Human Services.

References

People from Sparta, Wisconsin
Military personnel from Wisconsin
University of Wisconsin–La Crosse alumni
Educators from Wisconsin
Members of the Wisconsin State Assembly
1923 births
2006 deaths
20th-century American politicians
American military personnel of World War II